The 1880 Melbourne Cup was a two-mile handicap horse race which took place on Tuesday, 2 November 1880.

This year was the twentieth running of the Melbourne Cup. The winner Grand Flaneur holds the distinction of being the only horse to win the Melbourne Cup and finish his or her career undefeated. Grand Flaneur won nine times including five times against the James Wilson trained Progress. Ridden by Peter St. Albans Progress started 3/1 favourite but Grand Flaneur at 4/1 won by a length despite carrying an extra stone in weight. Grand Flaneur would go on to sire future cup winners Bravo and Patron.

This is the list of placegetters for the 1880 Melbourne Cup.

See also

 Melbourne Cup
 List of Melbourne Cup winners
 Victoria Racing Club

References

External links
1880 Melbourne Cup footyjumpers.com

1880
Melbourne Cup
Melbourne Cup
19th century in Melbourne
1880s in Melbourne